San Fernando is a  department of Chaco Province in Argentina.

The provincial subdivision has a population of about 365,000 inhabitants in an area of  3,489 km², and its capital city is Resistencia, which is also the provincial capital. It located around 1,020 km from the Capital federal.

Municipalities

The department consists of 5 first-level municipalities:
Barranqueras
Basail
Fontana
Puerto Vilelas
Resistencia (capital)

Villages
 

 El Paranacito

References

External links
Resistencia Municipal Website (Spanish)
Website containing information about Resistencia (Spanish)

1878 establishments in Argentina
Departments of Chaco Province